Oonops amoenus is a spider species found in France.

See also 
 List of Oonopidae species

References 
 J. Denis, Araignées du Nord de la France (3e note) (1943)

External links 

Oonopidae
Spiders of Europe
Spiders described in 1916